El paseo de la gracia de Dios ("The Walk of the Grace of God") is a Venezuelan telenovela which starred Luis Fernández, Nohely Arteaga, Beatriz Valdés and Carmen Julia Álvarez. It was produced and broadcast on Marte TV in 1993.

Synopsis 
Played out against a backdrop of political upheaval, this story of untamed passion and fatal vengeance throws two lovers together in an impossible affair that can only end in tragedy, unless their love can triumph intense drama of power and romance.

Cast 
 Luis Fernández
 Nohely Arteaga
 Beatriz Valdés
 Carmen Julia Álvarez
 Elba Escobar as Concepción Quijano
 Jesus Nebot
 Daniela Alvarado
 Veronica Ortiz as Clara Delfino
 Isabel Moreno as Soledad Mendoza
 Beatriz Fuentes
 Raquel Castaño
 Aitor Gaviria as Antonio Trenard
+ Nelson Diaz as Peter Gonzalez
Maria Eugenia Perera

External links
El paseo de la gracia de Dios at the Internet Movie Database

1993 telenovelas
Venezuelan telenovelas
1993 Venezuelan television series debuts
1993 Venezuelan television series endings
Spanish-language telenovelas